George White Baxter (January 7, 1855 – December 18, 1929) was an American politician who served as territorial governor of Wyoming from November 11, 1886 – December 20, 1886.

Early years
Baxter was born in Hendersonville, North Carolina on January 7, 1855, the son of Judge John Baxter and Orra Alexander Baxter. When he was two years old, Baxter's family moved to Knoxville, Tennessee, where he lived much of his life.

Baxter attended university in Knoxville but later continued his education at the United States Military Academy at West Point. He left Knoxville and enrolled at West Point in 1873 and graduated in 1877. After graduating he was commissioned a second lieutenant and he served in the Third United States Cavalry for three years. Baxter arrived in Wyoming in 1881 after leaving the Army.

Political career
On November 11, 1886 Baxter was appointed the governor of the then-U.S. territory of Wyoming by President Grover Cleveland. He replaced Francis E. Warren, who faced scrutiny for his business dealings. Baxter's time as governor was short-lived, however; he served in the position until only December 20, 1886. He resigned the office and was replaced, temporarily by the Secretary of the Territory, Elliot S.N. Morgan.

Baxter returned to politics in 1889, serving as a delegate to the Wyoming Constitutional Convention. Later, in 1890, he made an unsuccessful run for governor of Wyoming. He returned to Knoxville in 1892 and entered private business.

Baxter was married to Margaret White McGhee, daughter of Knoxville businessman Charles McClung McGhee.

Death
Baxter died in New York City in 1929.

References

Further reading
 Jackson, W. Turrentine. "The Governorship of Wyoming, 1885-1889: A Study in Territorial Politics," (JSTOR), The Pacific Historical Review, Vol. 13, No. 1, March 1944, pp. 1–11. Accessed 3 March 2008.

1855 births
1929 deaths
Governors of Wyoming Territory
United States Military Academy alumni
Politicians from Knoxville, Tennessee
United States Army officers